Jack Kolbeck is an American politician serving as a member of the South Dakota Senate from the 13th district. Elected in 2016, he assumed office on January 10, 2017.

Background 
Kolbeck was born in McCook County, South Dakota. He earned a bachelor's degree in business from South Dakota State University. He and his wife, Muriel, have three children. Prior to serving in the Senate, Kolbeck worked as a beer distributor in Sioux Falls, South Dakota. He is a member of the Republican Party.

References 

Living people
People from McCook County, South Dakota
Businesspeople from South Dakota
Republican Party South Dakota state senators
South Dakota State University alumni
21st-century American politicians
Year of birth missing (living people)